Liberalism has been a major trend in Canadian politics since the late 18th century. Canada has the same features of other liberal democracies in the Western democratic political tradition. This article gives an overview of liberalism in Canada. It includes a brief history of liberal parties with substantial representation in parliament. Canadian liberalism is different from the American use of the term, as it contains ideas such as support for economic liberalism.

Liberalism in Canadian history

Historically, Canada has had two liberal phases. Prior to the 1960s, Canadian politics were classically liberal, i.e., there was a focus on individual liberty, representative government, and free markets. This brand of liberalism can be traced to the arrival in Canada of the United Empire Loyalists and the enactment of the Constitutional Act of 1791. The Constitutional Act established representative government through the elected assemblies of Upper and Lower Canada.  While the Loyalists were faithful to British institutions and opposed to American republicanism, they were committed to North American ideals of individual liberty and representative government. This brand of liberalism was prominent through the Liberal government of Wilfrid Laurier, which advocated such policies as free trade with the United States, and beyond.

The second liberalism began, roughly, in the 1960s with the election of Lester B. Pearson as leader of the Liberal Party of Canada and can be traced through the politics of Pierre Trudeau, Jean Chrétien, and Paul Martin. This liberalism is what is properly called in a global context social liberalism, or what contemporary North American use of the word signifies as liberalism: liberal democracy, social justice, social progressivism, Third Way, multiculturalism, diplomacy in foreign policy, and a regulated free market economy (during the Trudeau era the Liberals arguably supported a mixed economy). 

There is argued to be a third phase of liberalism emerging that is centred on a more sustainable form of politics. The argument is that action is needed to ensure that the environment, economy, and social elements of society will function not only in the short term, but long term as well. If action is not taken on all of these pressing issues then it can cause a direct threat to our freedoms. This emerging new liberalism is centred on an ideal of 'timeless freedom' which seeks to preserve the freedom of future generations through proactive action today. This would extend both positive and negative rights and responsibilities to future generations.

Liberal parties
Liberal parties developed in both the French and English speaking parts of Canada, and led to the formation of the Liberal Party of Canada. Liberal parties exist on a provincial level, but while they mostly share similar ideologies, not all provincial parties are officially affiliated with the federal party.

In Canada, a "capital-L" liberal refers  to the policies and ideas of the Liberal Party of Canada/Parti Libéral du Canada (member LI), the most frequent governing party of Canada for the last century and one of the largest liberal parties around the world. The Quebec Liberal Party (Parti libéral du Québec) combines liberalism with more conservative ideas. Only federal parties are included in the following timeline. For inclusion in this scheme, it isn't necessary for parties to have explicitly labelled themselves as a liberal party.

Timeline of the federal Liberal Party

Canadian Party / Patriot Party / Red Party
1806: Liberals in the Francophone part of Canada formed the Canadian Party (Parti Canadien)
1826: The party is renamed Patriot Party (Parti Patriote) and is led by Louis-Joseph Papineau
1848: The party is further reorganised into the Red Party (Parti rouge)
1867: The PR merged into the present-day Liberal Party of Canada

Reform Party
1841: The Upper Canada Reform Party is formed
1855: Radical members formed the Clear Grits.
1867: The Reform Party merged into Liberal Party of Canada

Clear Grits / Liberal Party of Canada
1855: Radical members of the Reform Party formed the Clear Grits
1867: The Clear Grits merged with the Reform Party, the Red Party and provincial liberal parties into the present-day Liberal Party of Canada

Current parties
In addition to the federal party, each province and the Yukon territory has its own Liberal Party; however, those in British Columbia, Alberta, Saskatchewan, Manitoba, Ontario and Quebec are no longer affiliated with the federal party. The British Columbia Liberal Party is notably centre-right and often described as a "free enterprise coalition", with supporters from both the federal Liberal and Conservative parties. Under their system of consensus government, political parties are not recognized in the territories of Nunavut and Northwest Territories.

Liberal leaders

Parti Patriote

Louis-Joseph Papineau

Clear Grits

George Brown

Parti Rouge

Antoine-Aimé Dorion

Liberal Party of Canada

Alexander Mackenzie
Edward Blake
Wilfrid Laurier
Daniel Duncan McKenzie
William Lyon Mackenzie King
Louis St. Laurent
Lester Bowles Pearson
Pierre Elliott Trudeau
John Turner
Jean Chrétien
Paul Martin
Bill Graham
Stéphane Dion
Michael Ignatieff
Bob Rae
Justin Trudeau

Liberal thinkers
Mario Bunge - Argentinian-Canadian professor of philosophy.
Michael Ignatieff - political philosopher and former leader of the federal Liberal Party.
Will Kymlicka - Canadian liberal thinker included in Contributions to liberal theory
Jan Narveson - Canadian political philosopher and defender of libertarianism, or classical liberalism, currently Emeritus Professor of Philosophy, University of Waterloo

References

See also
 Blue Grit
 Trudeauism
 Conservatism in Canada
 Socialism in Canada
 Republicanism in Canada
 Monarchism in Canada
 Fascism in Canada
 Anarchism in Canada
 History of Canada
 Politics of Canada
 List of political parties in Canada

Liberalism in Canada
Political history of Canada
Political movements in Canada